Belgrandiella parreyssi is a species of minute freshwater snail with a gill and an operculum, an aquatic gastropod mollusk in the family Hydrobiidae. This species is endemic to Austria where it is found only in one thermal spring at Bad Voeslau, south of Vienna. Due to man made changes of the habitat the population has been decreasing rapidly since the 1970s.

References

Bibliography 
 Ludwig Karl Georg Pfeiffer (1841). Beiträge zur Molluskenfauna Deutschlands. Archiv für Naturgeschichte 7 (1): p. 227: Paludina, 1. P. Parreyssii

Hydrobiidae
Belgrandiella
Endemic fauna of Austria
Gastropods described in 1841
Taxonomy articles created by Polbot
Taxa named by Ludwig Karl Georg Pfeiffer